= Lothar Mühleisen =

Lothar Mühleisen MP

Member of the Maribor Parliament for Maribor
- In office 1927–1929

Personal details
- Born: 25 September 1876 Ljubljana
- Died: 1956 (aged 79–80)
- Profession: lawyer

Lothar Mühleisen (1876 – 1956) was an Austro-Hungarian and later Yugoslav lawyer and politician. He was a lawyer and notary in Marburg (now Maribor) in then-Austria-Hungary. When Marburg became part of the Kingdom of Serbs, Croats and Slovenes after the First World War, he became active in Yugoslav politics and was chairman of the Politischer und wirtschaftlicher Verein der Deutschen in Slowenien, a party representing the German minority. He was a Member of the parliament of Maribor oblast from 1927 to 1929, and a member of the city council of Maribor from 1924 to 1931. As a politician Mühleisen worked to increase the influence of the German minority in Yugoslavia in "all sectors of state and government." He was no longer active in politics after 1935 and fled to Austria in 1945.
